Mojtaba Abdollahi (born 1966 in Tehran) is an Iranian conservative politician who currently serves as the governor of Alborz province since November 7, 2021.

References

1966 births
Living people
Governors of Alborz Province
Politicians from Tehran